The Pegu Range  (Pegu Yoma or Bago Yoma) is a range of low mountains or hills and uplands between the Irrawaddy and the Sittaung River in central Burma (Myanmar).  The range runs from Mount Popa in the north to Singuttara Hill (Theingottara Hill) in the south. Both the Pegu River and the Sittaung River originate in the Pegu Range.

High points

Geology
The Pegu Range consists of folded and faulted Paleogene marine sediments combined with more recent volcanics.

History
The Shwedagon Pagoda was built sometime before 1000 A.D. on Singguttara Hill.

The Pegu Range was the original site of the 1930-1931 Saya San uprising against the British. Saya San raised the flag of independence on Alantaung Hill near Tharrawaddy.

Later the Pegu Range became a center for the Communist Party of Burma.

Ecology
The northern end of the Pegu merges into the Burmese Dry Belt, while in the south there is over 80 inches of rainfall a year. The hills of the Pegu Range were originally heavily forested with teak and other commercially exploitable hardwoods. The southern forests were "ironwood forests", while the central and northern forests were teak. Extensive logging has caused the present deforestation and increased erosion in the area.

Notes

Mountain ranges of Myanmar